Thore Ehrling (December 29, 1912, Stockholm - October 21, 1994, Stockholm) was a Swedish trumpeter, composer, and bandleader, who led jazz and popular music ensembles.

Ehrling played with Frank Vernon's ensemble from 1930 to 1934, and concomitantly studied at the Royal Swedish Academy of Music. From 1935 to 1938 he played under Håkan von Eichwald and did arrangement and composition work on the side. He founded his own ensemble in 1938, which grew to big band size in the nineteen years it was active. This group played popular music and jazz, recorded frequently, and played often on Swedish radio. The group featured many sidemen who went on to become prominent on the Swedish jazz scene, such as Uffe Baadh and Carl-Henrik Norin, and accompanied popular Swedish singers such as Inger Berggren and Lily Berglund.

References
"Thore Ehrling". The New Grove Dictionary of Jazz. 2nd edition, ed. Barry Kernfeld.

Swedish jazz trumpeters
Male trumpeters
Swedish jazz bandleaders
Swedish composers
Swedish male composers
Musicians from Stockholm
1912 births
1994 deaths
20th-century trumpeters
20th-century Swedish male musicians
20th-century Swedish musicians
Male jazz musicians